Pita Bolatoga Senibiaukula (born 30 November 1984) is a Fijian football player. A midfielder, he has played for Labasa FC and Hekari United FC  in Fiji. He was also on the Fiji national squad, participating in the South Pacific Games in 2007 and in Fiji's qualifying matches for the 2010 and 2012 World Cup.

References 

 futbolplanet.de
 sportingpulse.com
 fijitimes.com
 oleole.com
 thedailypunt.com

External links 
 
 
 

1984 births
Living people
I-Taukei Fijian people
Fijian footballers
Fiji international footballers
Fijian expatriate footballers
Expatriate footballers in Papua New Guinea
Hekari United players
Fijian expatriate sportspeople in Papua New Guinea
Place of birth missing (living people)
Labasa F.C. players
Association football midfielders
2008 OFC Nations Cup players
2012 OFC Nations Cup players
2016 OFC Nations Cup players